This is a list of members of the 9th Legislative Assembly of Queensland from 1883 to 1888, as elected at the 1883 colonial elections held between 10 August 1883 and 30 October 1883 (due to problems of distance and communications, it was not possible to hold the elections on a single day).

See also
Premier:
 Samuel Griffith (Ministerial) (1883–1888)

Notes
 The First Griffith Ministry was constituted on 13 November 1883. As a result, all new ministers had to resign their seats and contest them at ministerial by-elections; all except Charles Dutton, member for Leichhardt, were unopposed. Additionally, on the same day, James Garrick, the member for Moreton, was appointed to the Queensland Legislative Council. Thomas MacDonald-Paterson, who had lost his seat of Rockhampton at the election three months earlier, was elected unopposed for Moreton on 21 November 1883, whilst Dutton was re-elected on 7 December.
 Following a petition alleging electoral fraud by Patrick Perkins or his supporters, on 21 February 1884, the Committee of Elections and Qualifications ruled the election of Patrick Perkins, the member for Aubigny, null and void. James Campbell was elected unopposed at the resulting by-election on 4 March 1884; although Perkins was able to contest the by-election, he decided not to do so.
 On 4 March 1884, the Committee of Elections and Qualifications ruled Frederick Cooper, one of the members for Cook, was disqualified from sitting in the Legislative Assembly. Thomas Campbell, one of the unsuccessful candidates at the 1883 poll, was declared elected. The Brisbane Courier editorial on 27 February, anticipating a new election being called in Cook, said: "There was so much personation on both sides that a new election would be desirable, if it could be assumed that it would be conducted more free from abuse than its predecessor."
 On 8 July 1884, John Hurley, the member for Maryborough, resigned after having been declared insolvent. John Annear won the resulting by-election on 25 July 1884.
 On 22 April 1885, Thomas MacDonald-Paterson, the member for Moreton, was appointed to the Queensland Legislative Council. Hiram Wakefield won the resulting by-election on 13 May 1885.
 On 4 August 1885, Thomas Campbell, the member for Cook, resigned after having been declared insolvent. Charles Lumley Hill won the resulting by-election on 16 September 1885.
 On 13 October 1885, John Lloyd Bale, the member for Enoggera, resigned due to ill health. Robert Bulcock was elected unopposed at the resulting by-election on 26 October 1885.
 The Additional Members Act 1885 created three new seats: Barcoo, Musgrave and an additional seat each in Townsville and Fortitude Valley. The following members were elected:
 Fortitude Valley (14 September 1885): John McMaster
 Townsville (11 November 1885): William Villiers Brown
 Barcoo (24 November 1885): Frank Reid Murphy
 Musgrave (5 January 1886): Robert Philp
 On 23 January 1886, Archibald Archer, the member for Blackall, left for Europe on a prolonged visit, and resigned his seat. William Pattison won the resulting by-election on 13 April 1886.
 On 16 April 1886, Frank Beattie, one of the members for Fortitude Valley, died. Samuel Brooks won the resulting by-election on 1 May 1886.
 On 5 June 1886, Thomas McIlwraith, the member for Mulgrave, resigned. Walter Adams won the resulting by-election on 10 July 1886.
 On 2 July 1887, Jacob Horwitz, the member for Warwick, resigned. Arthur Morgan was returned unopposed. won the resulting by-election on 18 July 1887.
 On 19 July 1887, Alfred Midgley, the member for Fassifern, resigned. George Thorn, Jr. won the resulting by-election on 4 August 1887.
 On 22 August 1887, William Miles, the member for Darling Downs, died. William Allan won the resulting by-election on 6 September 1887.
 On 17 March 1888, Thomas McWhannell, the member for Gregory, died. No by-election was held due to the proximity of the 1888 election.

References

 Waterson, Duncan Bruce: Biographical Register of the Queensland Parliament 1860-1929 (second edition), Sydney 2001.
 Alphabetical Register of Members (Queensland Parliament)
 The General Election. List of Candidates Brisbane Courier, 26 April 1888, p. 6.

Members of Queensland parliaments by term
19th-century Australian politicians